The Tashkent Challenger is a tennis tournament held in Tashkent, Uzbekistan since 2008. It is currently part of the Association of Tennis Professionals (ATP) Challenger Tour and is played on outdoor hard courts.

Between 1997 and 2002, there was a tournament of a level equivalent to what today is the ATP 250 series, played in Tashkent, the Tashkent Open.

Past finals

Singles

Doubles

External links 
Official Website

 
ATP Challenger Tour
Tennis tournaments in Uzbekistan
Recurring sporting events established in 2008
2008 establishments in Uzbekistan
Sport in Tashkent
Hard court tennis tournaments